The 2019 UNOH 200 is a NASCAR Gander Outdoors Truck Series race held on August 15, 2019, at Bristol Motor Speedway in Bristol, Tennessee. Contested over 200 laps on the  concrete short track, it was the 17th race of the 2019 NASCAR Gander Outdoors Truck Series season, first race of the Playoffs, and the first race of the Round of 8.

Background

Track

Bristol Motor Speedway, formerly known as Bristol International Raceway and Bristol Raceway, is a NASCAR short track venue located in Bristol, Tennessee. Constructed in 1960, it held its first NASCAR race on July 30, 1961. Despite its short length, Bristol is among the most popular tracks on the NASCAR schedule because of its distinct features, which include steep banking, an all concrete surface, two pit roads, and stadium-like seating.

Entry list

Practice

First practice

Final practice

Qualifying

Qualifying results

. – Playoffs driver

Race

Summary
Brett Moffitt started from the pole, and was locked in a fierce battle with Ross Chastain throughout Stage 1. Chastain led 78 laps and edged out Moffitt to claim the stage victory. Chastain was penalized for a pit road safety violation during stage 2. The roles switched in stage 2 saw a dramatic ending to the stage between Moffitt, Chastain, and Chandler Smith. In the end, Moffitt took advantage of lapped trucks and edged out Chastain for the win.

Grant Enfinger and Sheldon Creed stayed out at the end of stage 2, while the leaders pitted. With a number of cautions, Enfinger managed to stay in the lead but was eventually passed by Moffitt on lap 173. Near the end of the race, Natalie Decker was spun around by a tow truck after being collected in a wreck with Gus Dean and Tyler Dippel. The final caution flew on lap 194 when Sam Mayer (in his first career start) hit the wall after contact with Ben Rhodes. On the restart, Moffitt and Smith had a brief side-by-side battle before Moffitt pulled away on the final lap and held off Smith to win the race, also locking himself into the next round of the playoffs.

After the race, Chastain was visibly upset at Raphaël Lessard and confronted him after the drivers exited their trucks, which ultimately led to the crew members being involved in attempting to calm them down.

Stage Results

Stage One
Laps: 55

Stage Two
Laps: 55

Final Stage Results

Stage Three
Laps: 90

. – Driver advanced to the next round of the playoffs.

. – Playoffs driver

References

NASCAR races at Bristol Motor Speedway
2019 in sports in Tennessee
UNOH 200